Valhalla Rising is a 2009 English-language Danish period adventure film directed by Nicolas Winding Refn, co-written by Refn and Roy Jacobsen, and starring Mads Mikkelsen. The film takes place "most certainly during the twelfth century of our era" and follows a Norse warrior named One-Eye and a boy as they travel with a band of Christian Crusaders by ship in the hopes of finding the Holy Land. Instead, they find themselves in an unknown land where they are assailed by unseen forces and dark visions.

Shot entirely in Scotland, the title is derived from the combination of Kenneth Anger's films Scorpio Rising and Lucifer Rising with a Viking theme. While the film garnered generally positive reviews, it only made back a fraction – about $731,613 – of its $5.7 million production cost.

Plot
In the Scottish Highlands, a mysterious mute one-eyed thrall is held captive by a Norwegian chieftain from Sutherland and forced to fight to the death against others. He receives his meals from a young thrall boy, who seems to sympathise with him. After dreaming of finding an arrowhead in a pool, One-Eye actually finds it when bathing. Using the arrowhead, he breaks free, kills the chieftain and his entourage and impales the chieftain's head on a nithing pole. As he sets out across the land, he realizes that the boy is following him. 'One-Eye' takes him in and has a vision of them travelling on a ship.

They reach a small group of Christian Norsemen who are persecuting the heathens of Scandinavian Scotland. The leader of the group asks the boy about the man's origins and he answers that One-Eye came from Hel. 'One-Eye' and the boy agree to sail with them to the Holy Land on a Crusade. The expedition soon encounters thick fog and gets lost in the North Atlantic. After many days, with supplies dwindling, land is sighted.

Sailing up a river, they are attacked by Skrælings armed with stone arrowheads. The party realises they are nowhere near the Holy Land. Their leader, a Christian zealot, nevertheless advocates conquering the locals and claiming the land in the name of God. 'One-Eye' has a vision of him building a cairn. Some of the group members angrily blame 'One-Eye' for their predicament and attack him; he kills them in self-defence. 'One-Eye' and the boy then leave and walk into the forest, followed by the group's second in command who has been stabbed by the leader for choosing to follow them. The leader's son then arrives to follow, as the leader stays behind to be killed by arrows. As the remainder of the group reaches the peak of a mountain, the son asks 'One-Eye' why he had to go through the horrible journey, but receives no answer. The leader's son decides to go back to his father, and the second in command is left on the mountain. Their eventual fate is unknown.

'One-Eye' and the boy eventually reach the coastline and are met by over a dozen clay-covered warriors. 'One-Eye' regards them knowingly, having seen them in a vision. He silently bids the boy goodbye, then walks into the middle of the tribesmen. He drops his axe and his knife and closes his eye. One warrior fells him with one blow to the back of the head, and the others finish him off. 'One-Eye's' spirit walks into the estuary next to his cairn and disappears below the surface. On the beach, the remaining tribe members quietly withdraw back into the forest, leaving the boy looking out at the ocean. The sky darkens, becoming that of the misty Highlands of the beginning of the film, and 'One-Eye's' face appears in the clouds.

Cast
Nicolas Winding Refn deliberately did not give formal names to the film's characters, save for One-Eye, although it is not the character's real name but a moniker given by The Boy. Names were assigned in the script to differentiate parts. This article addresses the characters as they are addressed by Refn on the DVD-commentary.

 Mads Mikkelsen as One-Eye
 Maarten Stevenson as The Boy
 Ewan Stewart as The General
 Gary Lewis as The Priest
 Alexander Morton as The Chieftain
 Jamie Sives as The General's Son
 Stewart Porter as The Chieftain's Son
 Gordon Brown as Christian Viking
 Gary McCormack as Lost Viking
 Charlie Allan as Viking

Release

The film premiered at the 66th Venice International Film Festival where it was shown out of competition on 4 September 2009. The Danish premiere followed on 31 March 2010. Vertigo Films released it in the United Kingdom on 30 April the same year.

Reception
On Rotten Tomatoes, the film holds a 74% approval rating based on 61 reviews with an average rating of 6.6/10. Metacritic gives the film a "generally favorable" average score of 61% based on reviews from 15 critics.

The reaction from Danish critics was split. Berlingske Tidende gave the film a rating of two out of six and called it "unbearably self-important". B.T., called it a masterpiece and gave it a perfect score of six out of six.

Philip French wrote in his review in The Observer that it felt "like watching woad dry, but hypnotic, densely atmospheric in a portentous way, and weirdly beautiful."

Soundtrack

The score of the film was composed by Refn's frequent collaborators Peter Peter and Peter Kyed. Originally Refn had intended Mogwai as the composers of the score. The soundtrack was commercially released on 7 October 2013 by Milan Records who also released the score to Refn's films Only God Forgives and The Neon Demon. The soundtrack contains the complete score and sections of the soundscapes sound designers Giles Lamb and Douglas MacDougall created for the film. Some sites incorrectly credits the track Free to Giles Lamb & Douglas MacDougall and the track Christians to Peter Peter.

 
Track listing
 "Introduction" – Peter Peter & Peter Kyed (1:03)
 "Caged" –  Giles Lamb & Douglas MacDougall (1:41)
 "One Eye Fights" – Giles Lamb & Douglas MacDougall (0:53)
 "Montage" – Peter Peter & Peter Kyed (4:22)
 "Arrowhead" – Giles Lamb & Douglas MacDougall (4:19)
 "Escape" – Peter Peter & Peter Kyed (1:02)
 "Return" – Peter Peter & Peter Kyed (3:03)
 "Free" – Peter Peter (1:56)
 "Christians" – Giles Lamb & Douglas MacDougall  (4:03)
 "Men of God" – Peter Kyed & Peter Peter (4:49)
 "The Boat" – Peter Peter & Peter Kyed (12:02)
 "Into Hell" – Peter Peter & Peter Kyed (3:40)
 "Hell" – Peter Peter & Peter Kyed (9:34)
 "Forest'" – Giles Lamb & Douglas MacDougall (2:14)
 "Valhalla Rising (End Credits)" – Peter Peter & Peter Kyed (5:33)

See also
 Survival film

References

External links
 
 
 The road to Valhalla
 BBC Film Network: Nicolas Winding Refn on Valhalla Rising
 Europe’s Times and Unknown Waters, Cluj-Napoca, Ormeny, Francisc-Norbert (30 December 2012). "Valhalla Rising – Of Wrath, Might and Meat"

2000s adventure drama films
2009 films
British adventure drama films
English-language Danish films
English-language Scottish films
English-language Welsh films
Films set in the 11th century
Films based on Norse mythology
Films set in the Viking Age
Scottish films
Films shot in Scotland
Films set in North America
Films set in pre-Columbian America
Films set in Scotland
Films directed by Nicolas Winding Refn
Vertigo Films films
Nimbus Film films
Scanbox Entertainment films
Danish adventure drama films
2009 drama films
2000s English-language films
2000s British films